Ackermann may also refer to the following:
Ackermann (surname), for many people with this name
Several mathematical objects named after Wilhelm Ackermann
Ackermann function
Ackermann ordinal
Ackermann set theory
Ackermann steering geometry, in mechanical engineering
Ackermann's formula, in control engineering
Der Ackermann aus Böhmen, or "The Ploughman from Bohemia", a work of poetry in Early New High German by Johannes von Tepl, written around 1401
Ackermannviridae, virus family named in honor of H.-W. Ackermann

See also
Ackerman (disambiguation)
Ackermans (disambiguation)
Akkerman (disambiguation)
Åkerman